Howard Klein may refer to:
 Howard Klein (music critic) (born 1931), American music critic and pianist
 Howard Klein (television producer), American television producer and talent manager